Jenins (Romansh: Gianin) is a municipality in the Landquart Region in the Swiss canton of Graubünden.

History
Jenins is first mentioned in 1139 as Uienennes.  In 1142 it was mentioned as Gininnes.

Geography

 
Of this area, 48% is used for agricultural purposes, while 40.1% is forested. Of the rest of the land, 3.6% is settled (buildings or roads) and the remainder (8.3%) is non-productive (rivers, glaciers or mountains).

Before 2017, the municipality was located in the Maienfeld sub-district of the Landquart district, after 2017 it was part of the Landquart Region.

Demographics
, 10.6% of the population was made up of foreign nationals. Over the last 10 years the population has grown at a rate of 8.6%. Most of the population speaks German (93.8%), with Romansh being second most common ( 1.2%) and English being third ( 0.9%).

, the gender distribution of the population was 49.1% male and 50.9% female. The age distribution, in Jenins is; 107 children or 14.3% of the population are between 0 and 9 years old. 48 teenagers or 6.4% are 10 to 14, and 35 teenagers or 4.7% are 15 to 19.  Of the adult population, 71 people or 9.5% of the population are between 20 and 29 years old.  134 people or 18.0% are 30 to 39, 118 people or 15.8% are 40 to 49, and 91 people or 12.2% are 50 to 59.  The senior population distribution is 60 people or 8.0% of the population are between 60 and 69 years old, 51 people or 6.8% are 70 to 79, there are 26 people or 3.5% who are 80 to 89, and there are 5 people or 0.7% who are 90 to 99.

In the 2007 federal election the most popular party was the SVP which received 40.7% of the vote. The next three most popular parties were the SP (22.5%), the FDP (20.4%) and the CVP (13.4%).

In Jenins about 77.4% of the population (between age 25-64) have completed either non-mandatory upper secondary education or additional higher education (either university or a Fachhochschule).

Jenins has an unemployment rate of 0.68%. , there were 107 people employed in the primary economic sector and about 29 businesses involved in this sector. 35 people are employed in the secondary sector and there are 8 businesses in this sector. 107 people are employed in the tertiary sector, with 14 businesses in this sector.

The historical population is given in the following table:

Heritage sites of national significance
Neu-Aspermont Castle is listed as a Swiss heritage site of national significance.

Sights

The Greisinger Museum houses the Greisinger Collection, Bernd Greisinger's private collection focused on J. R. R. Tolkien's Middle-earth. The collection, consists primarily of art and literature and collectors' items of any kind. It opened on 4 October 2013. The museum is a non-profit foundation. The main entrance is a round hobbit door and many of the rooms are underground.

The construction of the museum started in mid-2008. Planning and building of the museum were orientated on optimizing the use of the Greisinger Collection.

References

External links

Official Web site of Jenins
Official Web site of Greisinger Museum

 
Municipalities of Graubünden
Cultural property of national significance in Graubünden